The Man Who Was Saturday is a 1985 thriller novel by the British writer Derek Lambert. An American defector to the Soviet Union schemes to return home against the best efforts of the KGB.

References

Bibliography
 Nancy-Stephanie Stone. A Reader's Guide to the Spy and Thriller Novel. G.K. Hall, 1997.

1985 British novels
Novels by Derek Lambert
British thriller novels
Hamish Hamilton books
Stein and Day books